When You're Smiling is the second studio album by Bradley Walsh, credited to Walsh and The Bradettes. It was released on 10 November 2017 through the record label Sony Music. The album contains mainly covers of traditional pop songs, by artists such as Frank Sinatra, Nat King Cole and Tony Bennett. One original track is featured, "You Know Best", co-written by Walsh and Steve Sidwell, who also produced the album.

Background 
Walsh decided to release a second album following the success of his debut album, saying "I am very flattered that so many people loved Chasing Dreams. The amazing response that we received was a big surprise to us all, and now we have to follow up that success with the second album. We have had a great time revisiting some of our favourite songs from stage and screen, and I am very proud of what we've achieved. I can only hope that people enjoy listening to it as much as we did making it."

Track listing

Critical reception 
When You're Smiling received mixed reviews from critics.

Charts

Weekly charts

References 

Bradley Walsh
2017 albums
Traditional pop albums
Sony Music UK albums